Robert Hosp (13 December 1939 – 5 October 2021) was a Swiss footballer who played as a forward. He represented the Switzerland national team at the 1966 FIFA World Cup. At club level, he most notably played for FC Lausanne-Sport.

Hosp died on 5 October 2021, at the age of 81.

References

External links
 FIFA profile
 

1939 births
2021 deaths
Swiss men's footballers
Association football forwards
Switzerland international footballers
1966 FIFA World Cup players
FC Concordia Basel players
FC Lausanne-Sport players
CS Chênois players